Giuseppe Signorini (1857–1932) was an Italian painter, mainly of orientalist subjects.

Biography
 
He was born in Rome in 1857. He studied at the Accademia di San Luca, and then worked under Aurelio Tiratelli, who introduced him to the very best Italian artists of the period. He mastered the technique of watercolor very early in his career.

He often traveled to the Paris Salon exhibitions, and was influenced by the styles and orientalist themes expressed by painters like Mariano Fortuny, Ernest Meissonier, and Gérôme. He traveled often to the Maghreb for inspiration, and developed a substantial collection of Islamic art and textiles. He also painted portraits in costume garb. He maintained studios in both Paris and Rome.

He painted a design for an Arabic Man with Musket found at Art Museum of Princeton. He painted in watercolor a costume drama depicting a Priest and Two Men Seated at a Table found at the Metropolitan Museum of Art.

See also
 List of Orientalist artists
 Orientalism

References

1857 births
1932 deaths
19th-century Italian painters
Italian male painters
20th-century Italian painters
Painters from Rome
Orientalist painters
19th-century Italian male artists
20th-century Italian male artists